Đức Thọ is a rural district of Hà Tĩnh province in the North Central Coast region of Vietnam. The village of Đông Thái, where the noted 19th-century anti-colonial leader Phan Đình Phùng was born, is located in Đức Thọ. As of 2003 the district had a population of 117,730. The district covers an area of 203 km². The district capital lies at Đức Thọ.

References

Districts of Hà Tĩnh province